Pristiphora laricis is a Palearctic species of  sawfly.

References

External links
 The sawflies (Symphyta) of Britain and Ireland

Hymenoptera of Europe
Tenthredinidae
Insects described in 1837